Kalininskoye is a rural locality (a village) in Kalininskoye Rural Settlement, Totemsky  District, Vologda Oblast, Russia. The population was 18 as of 2002.

Geography 
Kalininskoye is located 23 km southwest of Totma (the district's administrative centre) by road. Gridinskaya is the nearest rural locality.

References 

Rural localities in Tarnogsky District